General Pacheco is a city in the Tigre Partido of the urban agglomeration of Greater Buenos Aires, Argentina.  The division's position inside Tigre significantly sums up to its importance inside the partido. According to the most recent census (2001), Pacheco had 43,287 inhabitants, making it the second most populated city of the partido. It is a suburb 38 km north of downtown Buenos Aires and is just a few blocks away from the Pan American Highway.

Economy
There are important automotive assembly plants; Ford Motor Argentina and Volkswagen plus Kraft Foods located in the area. In addition the Techint Group has an industrial plant there. There are 161 occupied factories with a total of 7,135 workers.

The shortwave-transmitter of Radiodifusión Argentina al Exterior is located in General Pacheco and can be heard all over the world.

Motor industry
General Pacheco is home to Ford Motor Argentina and Volkswagen. Argentina's assembly sector includes these two along with CIADEA, Sevel, General Motors, FIAT, Toyota and Autolatina. Autolatina is the third largest author producer in Argentina after Sevel and CIADEA. This sector is composed of 400 firms and 35,700 employees and contributes to .45 percent to GDP, accounting for 16% of the industry's output.

The Ford Falcon plant was produced in Argentina in 1965 in the city of General Pacheco. Ford produced the Ford Falcon From 1961 to 1991. Once Pacheco Stamping and Assembly was established in Argentina and got up and running, through modifications in indigenous institutional arrangements, Argentina soon became the thirteenth largest exporter of automobiles nationwide. These big industries have direct impacts on the population that usually go unrecognized. This population that goes unrecognized is also the population that does most of the work for the industry. Ford hired a workforce in which 90% had a high school education and only one third had a university degree. Plants like this rely on young and educated workers with often little industrial experience. Workers come into the motor industry at around the age of 23, after working in the agriculture industry prior to the motor industry. When establishing a huge industry, policies with the intent of progression for the assembly sector matter more than the social structure of the country, let alone the population of one city. A combination of school and training became central to the plant's operation in order to continue to manufacture cars.

According to information provided by Autolatina, 49% of the workers in these plants have completed elementary school, 19% have completed secondary school and only 6% have a university degree. Location of school and large numbers of educated workers become a new component in defining the geographical organization of the motor industry. For example, Henry Ford Technical School is located in General Pacheco and strives to educate their students in excellent technical skills to prepare them for the motor industry.

The Argentinean motor industry has scarce resources in terms of competitiveness but it is an achieving world-class economy of scale in the production of transmissions.

Food industry
The main production plant of Kraft Foods Argentina (KFTA) is located in General Pacheco. In 2009, there was a major H1N1 influenza pandemic outbreak, which started in Mexico late March and made its way to Argentina that same year. This outbreak had a direct effect on the workers of the company. 150 workers were laid off, making it the most prominent labor-management conflict in Argentina in 2009. This led to a picket on the Pan American Highway. The workers asked for a raise in salary of 70% and requested a one-month paid leave in quest of avoiding the flu. Both of these requests were rejected by the company. Management wanted to prevent the workers from benefiting from future collective bargains. 40 workers experienced violent eviction by the police force.

Thousands of wage-workers face the possibility of unemployment and threatened livelihoods due to dominating employment relations. Therefore, workers get together and create a social movement in hopes of obtaining a progressive collective action. The goal is to build new social values, new organization forms and new modes of mobilization among food factories. However, this may be difficult due to limits imposed by the markets dynamics and realm of production. In most cases, this leads to self-management allowing for the distribution of tasks within the collective of workers and equal distribution of income. This opportunity for personal development is unseen among a company where the workers do not take initiative. In most cases, the workers are forced to simply compromise and their needs and interests go unrecognized. Social organization is of essence when determining the outcome and success of an industry.

References

External links

Populated places in Buenos Aires Province
1880 establishments in Argentina
Tigre Partido
Populated places established in 1880
Cities in Argentina